The 2016–17 Gonzaga Bulldogs men's basketball team represented Gonzaga University in the 2016–17 NCAA Division I men's basketball season. The team was led by head coach Mark Few, who was in his 18th season as head coach. The team played its home games at McCarthey Athletic Center in Spokane, Washington. The Bulldogs (also informally referred to as the Zags) played in their 37th season as a member of the West Coast Conference.

The 2016–17 season was arguably the greatest season in Gonzaga's 109-year basketball history. The Bulldogs finished the regular season with a 32–1 record, only blemished by a loss to BYU on February 25. They finished ranked second in the AP Poll, the highest final national ranking in school history.  They won both the West Coast Conference regular season and tournament championships, and advanced to the first NCAA National Championship game in the school's history—the deepest NCAA Tournament run for a WCC team since San Francisco advanced to its third consecutive Final Four in 1957. With a victory over South Carolina in the regional semifinal, the Bulldogs tied the NCAA Division I record for the second-most wins in a season. They lost in the NCAA National Championship game to North Carolina.

Previous season 
The Bulldogs team finished the 2015–16 season 28–8, 15–3 in WCC play to earn a share for the WCC regular season championship. They defeated Portland, BYU, and Saint Mary's to win the WCC tournament and earn the conference's automatic bid to the NCAA tournament; the Bulldogs have sequentially earned a place in this tournament for the past 18 years. As a No. 11 seed, they defeated No. 6 seed Seton Hall and No. 3 seed Utah to advance to the Sweet Sixteen. There they lost to No. 10 seed and eventual Final Four participant Syracuse.

Preseason
The Bulldogs were picked to finish first in the WCC preseason poll. Przemek Karnowski and Josh Perkins were selected to the All-WCC preseason team.

The Bulldogs were ranked No. 14 in the preseason AP poll and No. 13 in the preseason Coaches Poll.

Offseason

Coaching changes

Departures

Additions to staff

Player departures

Incoming transfers

2016 recruiting class

2017 recruiting class

Roster

 Roster is subject to change as/if players transfer or leave the program for other reasons.
 Przemek Karnowski received a medical hardship waiver and decided to play his final season of eligibility at Gonzaga in 2016–17. He played the first five games for the Zags in 2015–16, but due to back problems, which eventually forced him to undergo surgery, he missed the rest of the season.
 Jesse Wade graduated high school in 2015, but before enrolling in college at Gonzaga, he left for a 2-year LDS mission in Lyon, France, and will arrive on campus as a freshman in Fall 2017.
 Jacob Larsen suffered a season-ending knee injury in a preseason practice, forcing him to redshirt the 2016–17 season. Larsen will have 4 years of eligibility remaining at the start of the 2017–18 season.
 Jack Beach did not suit up for Gonzaga's season opener against Utah Valley and decided to redshirt the 2016–17 season. Beach will have 3 years of eligibility remaining at the start of the 2017–18 season.
 Zach Norvell decided to redshirt the 2016–17 season to recover from summer knee surgery on his meniscus. Norvell will have 4 years of eligibility remaining at the start of the 2017–18 season.

Coaching staff

Schedule and results

Gonzaga's non-conference schedule included a matchup with Washington as well as neutral court games against Tennessee (in Nashville) and Arizona (in Los Angeles). The Zags were invited to play in the AdvoCare Invitational in Florida, where they ultimately played against Quinnipiac, Florida, and Iowa State. Gonzaga played 18 conference games (home-and-home) within a nine-week span, beginning on December 29, 2016. The Zags also played in and won the single-elimination WCC Tournament, which took place March 2–7, 2017 at Orleans Arena in Las Vegas. This year's tournament was the first under a new 3-year contract with that venue.

|-
!colspan=12 style=| Exhibition

|-
!colspan=12 style=| Non-conference regular season

|-
!colspan=12 style=|  WCC regular season

|-
!colspan=12 style=| WCC Tournament

|-
!colspan=12 style=| NCAA tournament

Rankings

*AP does not release post-NCAA tournament rankings

Notes

References

Gonzaga Bulldogs men's basketball seasons
Gonzaga
Gonzaga
NCAA Division I men's basketball tournament Final Four seasons
Gonzaga
Gonzaga